INBAL or Inbal may refer to:


People

Given name
 Inbal Dror (born 1976), Israeli fashion designer
 Inbal Gavrieli (born 1975), former Israeli politician 
 Inbal Perlmuter (1971–1997), Israeli composer
 Inbal Pezaro (born 1987), Israeli paralympic champion
 Inbal Schwarz (born 1984), Israeli paralympic swimmer 
 Inbal Segev, cellist, who grew up in Israel

Surname
 Eliahu Inbal (born 1936), Israeli conductor

Other uses
 Inbal Dance Theater, an Israeli dance company
 Inbal Jerusalem Hotel
 Instituto Nacional de Bellas Artes y Literatura (INBAL), the national Mexican institute of fine arts and literature

Hebrew-language surnames